Lo Chao-cheng (born 26 April 1969) is a Taiwanese wrestler. He competed in the men's freestyle 52 kg at the 1988 Summer Olympics.

References

1969 births
Living people
Taiwanese male sport wrestlers
Olympic wrestlers of Taiwan
Wrestlers at the 1988 Summer Olympics
Place of birth missing (living people)
20th-century Taiwanese people